Johan A. Vikan (20 April 1912, Stjørdal – 16 July 1997) was a Norwegian politician for the Centre Party.

He was elected to the Norwegian Parliament from Nord-Trøndelag in 1969, and was re-elected on one occasion.

On the local level he was mayor of Stjørdal municipality from 1951 to 1955 and 1959 to 1966. From 1963 to 1966 he was also county mayor of Nord-Trøndelag.

Outside politics he worked in agriculture. In the Norwegian Agrarian Association he was a member of the board from 1958, was deputy chairman from 1959 to 1963 and chairman from 1966 to 1969.

References

1912 births
1997 deaths
Members of the Storting
Centre Party (Norway) politicians
Mayors of places in Nord-Trøndelag
Chairmen of County Councils of Norway
20th-century Norwegian politicians